The Japanese General Government Building (Joseon-chongdokbu Cheongsa), also known as the Government-General Building and the Seoul Capitol, was a building located in Jongno District of Seoul, South Korea, from 1926 to 1996.

The Government-General Building was constructed by the Empire of Japan on the site of the Gyeongbokgung complex, the royal palace of the Joseon, and was the largest government building in East Asia. The Government-General Building served as the chief administrative building of Chōsen and the seat of its Governor-General in Keijō from 1926 until 1945. The Government-General Building was the scene of numerous important events after South Korean independence in 1948, becoming the seat of the National Assembly of South Korea and housing offices of the Government of South Korea until 1950 when it was damaged during the Korean War and intentionally left derelict. President Park Chung-hee restored the Government-General Building from 1962 for government functions until the early 1980s and housed the National Museum of South Korea from 1986.

The Government-General Building was controversially planned for demolition in 1993, long felt to be a symbol of Japanese imperialism and impeding reconstruction of Gyeongbokgung, and was demolished from 1995 to 1996.

History

Japanese Korea
In 1910, Japanese colonization of Korea began when the Empire of Japan formally annexed the Korean Empire in the Japan–Korea Annexation Treaty, ending over 500 years of Joseon rule and losing its sovereignty after five years of Japanese invasion and colonization. The Japanese established the Korean capital city of Hanseong (Seoul) as the colonial capital of Japanese Korea, renaming it to Keijō in Japanese and Gyeongseong in Korean. In 1911, the Japanese decided to erect a new building in Seoul to house the new colonial administration under the Governor-General of Korea. The Government-General Building was designed by architect Georg De Lalande in the Neoclassical style popular in Japan at the time. The new structure was a grey granite building with a copperplate dome. De Lalande, who was German and had lived in Japan since 1901, had designed numerous administrative buildings there until he died in 1914, and was succeeded on the project by Japanese architect Nomura Ichiro. Construction of the Government-General Building began on 25 June 1916 inside the grounds of the Gyeongbokgung Palace, the former royal palace complex of the Joseon dynasty, located north of central Seoul. The location was chosen to deliberately obstruct the view of Gyeongbokgung from central Seoul and to legimitize Japanese colonial rule. All but 10 of the 400 Gyeongbokgung palace buildings were demolished to make way for the construction of the Government-General Building and its grounds, and further demolitions were prevented only by a campaign by Japanese intellectual Muneyoshi Yanagi

The Government-General Building was officially completed ten years later on 1 October 1926, and the office of the Governor-General was transferred there.

After Korean independence

Japanese rule in Korea ended upon the Surrender of Japan in August 1945 and the United States occupied the territory of Korea south of the 38th parallel (including Seoul) where the United States Army Military Government in Korea (USAMGIK) was established.
The US occupation government renamed the Government-General Building to Capitol Hall and it became internationally known as the Seoul Capitol. On 31 May 1948, the Government-General Building became the seat of South Korea's constitutional assembly, the precursor to the National Assembly of South Korea. On 24 July, the swearing in ceremony of Syngman Rhee as the first President of South Korea was held in front of the Government-General Building. On 15 August, the inauguration of the First Republic of Korea (South Korea) occurred at the Government-General Building following the official transfer of power from the USAMGIK to the Government of South Korea, becoming the first seat of National Assembly, and was occupied by a variety of government offices. The Japanese Governor-General's office became the Prime Minister's office.

The Government-General Building was heavily damaged following the outbreak of the Korean War in June 1950, when the forces of North Korea invaded South Korea across the 38th parallel, and the Korean People's Army briefly occupied the building as an army headquarters until United Nations forces recaptured Seoul in September 1950. The North Koreans set fire to the Government-General Building upon their retreat, completely destroying the interior, and it was left abandoned and in a ruinous state, even after the war ended in 1953. The nationalistic President Rhee refused either to repair the building or reoccupy it, as its ruinous state was partly symbolic of the end of the Japanese occupation, but started using the remaining outdoor space as an outdoor music hall.

The Government-General Building was survived to enjoy two more decades as the seat of government following Park Chung-hee's 1961 May 16 coup, establishing the Supreme Council of National Reconstruction military government. On 22 November 1962, General Park carried out extensive repair and refurbishing work on the derelict Government-General Building to use it as much-needed offices for the central government. As a witness to the major political and social upheavals of modern Korean history, the building housed government offices including that of the Prime Minister, until early 1980s when new quarters were constructed nearby. In 1968, the Western-style front gate was demolished for the reconstruction of Gwanghwamun, the main and largest gate of Gyeongbokgung Palace. In 1970, many government offices were moved to the newly constructed Central Government Complex located adjacent to the Government-General Building.

On 25 May 1981, President Chun Doo-hwan gave instruction to move the National Museum of Korea to the Government-General Building. In 1982, the South Korean Government announced a moving plan to the people of Korea, and the project begun. After the last State Council meeting was held there on 19 May 1983, it underwent a period of refurbishment, reopening in August 1986 as the National Museum of Korea.

Demolition
The issue of the Government-General Building's future was opened after Kim Young-sam became president in 1993. In August of that year, President Kim announced that it would be demolished beginning in 1995, the 50th anniversary of the end of Japanese colonial rule and the 600th anniversary of Gyeongbokgung Palace. Plans were announced for a new National Museum to be built on the site. The Government-General Building had been subject to calls for demolition since the presidency of Rhee, almost immediately after the end of Japanese colonial rule.

The Government-General Building's demolition proposal was controversial in South Korea and there was intense public debate on the issue. President Kim and proponents of the demolition argued that the building was a symbol of Japanese imperialism that had been built deliberately to deface Gyeongbokgung Palace. Opponents of the demolition countered that South Korea, now a wealthy nation, was no longer troubled by such symbolism and that reminders of the colonial era were needed. Many opposed the demolition on the grounds of the expense incurred and the architectural merit of the existing building, as other Japanese colonial-era buildings in Seoul, such as the old Seoul Station and Seoul Metropolitan Library, are considered landmarks of the city. Additionally, the building itself was the site of important events such as the declaration of independence of South Korea.

A proposal was made to move the Government-General Building to a new site, although this would have been far more expensive than demolition. Nevertheless, demolition began on South Korea's Liberation Day (Gwangbokjeol) on 15 August 1995, with the removal of the dome. On 13 November 1996, the building was completely demolished. Today, the top of the dome and several other recognizable pieces of the building can be seen at the Independence Hall Museum in Cheonan, as part of a monument to commemorate the history behind the building and its demolition.

Gallery

See also
Gyeongbokgung Palace complex — constructed in 1394, first reconstructed in 1867, under reconstruction 1989 to present
Presidential Office Building, Taipei
Japanese architecture

Notes

Buildings and structures in Seoul
Korea under Japanese rule
Government buildings completed in 1926
Government buildings in South Korea
Neoclassical architecture
Buildings and structures demolished in 1996
Demolished buildings and structures in South Korea
History of Seoul